Bahria Icon Tower is a recently on-hold skyscraper complex in the seaside municipality of Clifton in Karachi, Pakistan. The complex also includes an adjacent 42-storey building and is owned by the Bahria Town Group.

Bahria Town Icon
Bahria Town Icon is a 62-storey  in the skyscraper complex, Bahria Icon Tower.

Bahria Hotel Tower

Bahria Hotel Tower is 42-storey  skyscraper in the  skyscraper complex, Bahria Icon Tower.

Mall of Karachi

Mall of Karachi is a mall located in Bahria Hotel Tower and Bahria Town Icon, it is spread across eight floors.

Location 
The complex is based on a four acre plot in the up-scale Clifton area, and is immediately adjacent to the Bagh Ibne Qasim park, and shrine of Abdullah Shah Ghazi - an 8th-century mystic who is widely regarded as the patron saint of Karachi.

History 
Construction began in 2009. During its construction, excavations for the foundations caused inconvenience for traffic flow. It was topped out in October 2017. In November 2018, a small fire broke out at the site where a marriage hall and cinema were being installed. Fireworks were shown on its completion. Construction has been slowed and marred by allegations of corruption against the owner of Bahria Group, Malik Riaz.

Details 
The main building consists of 10 floors of serviced corporate offices and 40 floors of serviced apartments, Pakistan's highest located terraced restaurant, a double-decker high speed elevator, and a shopping mall. The building will be serviced by 16 high-speed elevators. It will have a carpark with 1,700 spaces, and total area of 2,230,500 m2 (24,008,902 ft²).

It has 62 floors above ground, and 7 below ground. It is made of reinforced concrete with a glass facade. Steel was procured by Cellpor, and produced in conjunction with the Luxembourg-based ArcelorMittal conglomerate. It is expected to complete by March 2023

Honors and awards 
The design won architectural design awards for efficient use of space and maximization of utility, including 
 Highly commended high-rise architecture, International Property Award winners from Asia Pacific 2012

Gallery

See also 
 List of tallest buildings in Pakistan
 List of tallest buildings in Karachi

References

External links

Skyscrapers in Karachi
Towers in Karachi
Office buildings in Karachi
Bahria Town
Residential skyscrapers in Pakistan
Skyscraper office buildings